Peter John Squires (born ) is an English former rugby union player and a first-class cricketer, who played in forty nine first-class matches for Yorkshire County Cricket Club between 1972 and 1976.

Squires was born 4 August 1951 in Ripon, Yorkshire, England. He was educated at both Ripon Grammar School and York St John University. Despite his healthy number of appearances, this right-handed opening batsman found runs hard to come by, scoring 1,271 at an average of 16.72, with a best score of 70.  He was no more prolific in his fifty six List A one day matches from 1971 to 1976, making 708 runs at 16.46 with a top score of 79 not out.  The only ball he bowled in one day cricket went to the boundary, and his 6.2 overs in first-class cricket cost 32 runs without success. Squires took fourteen first-class catches. He played club cricket for Manningham Mills C.C.as well as for Harrogate C.C.

Squires was better known for his rugby union exploits, playing on the wing for Ripon RUFC and Harrogate RUFC and twenty nine times for England in the 1970s, scoring six tries, as well as playing for the British and Irish Lions on the 1977 British Lions tour to New Zealand.  He continued to play for Ripon into his early forties.  He played in England's 23-6 victory over Australia at Twickenham in January 1976.

Squires also performed a stint at Harrogate Grammar School as games teacher, coaching the senior boys primarily in rugby union, but also in other sports such as cricket, hockey and athletics.

He is currently the Business Development Manager for Wharfe Bank Brewery in Pool in Wharfedale, near Otley in Yorkshire.

References

External links
Cricinfo Profile
Cricket Archive Statistics

1951 births
Living people
British & Irish Lions rugby union players from England
England international rugby union players
English cricketers
English rugby union players
North of England Rugby Union team
People educated at Ripon Grammar School
Rugby union players from Ripon
Yorkshire County RFU players
Yorkshire cricketers
Rugby union wings
Harrogate RFC players